The Alashan ground squirrel (Spermophilus alashanicus) is a species of squirrel. It is native to China and Mongolia.

This squirrel lives at elevations up to 3200 meters. It lives on the steppe and in foothills and alpine meadows. In China it can be found in desert habitat. It is associated with the plant species Amygdalus pedunculata and A. polyrrhizum.

It is brown or gray with a pale underside. In the summer it develops a chestnut wash along the shoulders. Most babies are born in June, with litter sizes ranging from one to nine.

References

Spermophilus
Mammals described in 1888
Taxa named by Eugen Büchner
Mammals of Mongolia
Rodents of China
Taxonomy articles created by Polbot